Torri may refer to:

People

Last name
Giuseppe Torri, also known as Pippo Torri, is an Italian politician
Omar Torri (born 1982), Italian professional football player
Pietro Torri (1650-1737), Italian Baroque composer

First name
Torri Edwards (born 1977), American sprinter
Torri Higginson (born 1969), Canadian actress
Torri Webster (born 1996), Canadian actress
Torri Williams (born 1986), American football safety, currently free agent

Places
Torri Superiore
Torri del Benaco
Torri di Quartesolo
Torri in Sabina